Bobby Paschal (born October 22, 1941) is a retired college basketball coach.  He was head coach of the South Florida Bulls team from 1986 to 1996, as well as the Southwestern Louisiana Ragin' Cajuns from 1978 to 1986.

A native of Enterprise, Alabama, Paschal played college basketball at Chipola College and Stetson University in Florida. Following the close of his college career, he coached at the high school level at Ashford High School in Alabama and then Plant High School in Tampa. He then spent a year as an assistant at Livingston College (now the University of West Alabama) while obtaining a master's degree before moving to Florida Southern College. He moved to Southwestern Louisiana in 1974 and was elevated to head coach with the departure of Jim Hatfield. 

Over his career, Bobby Paschal was head coach of two NCAA Division I programs.  He had a career won/loss record of 280-244 which included four NCAA tournament appearances and six NIT tournament appearances.  One Bobby Paschal coached team reached the NIT final four.  Another made an NIT elite eight appearance. In Paschal's eight years with the Ragin' Cajuns, his team's 153 wins rank fourth in the number of wins for the program.  His teams ranked second in Ragin' Cajun history in winning percentage at .643 (153-85).  His 1981-82 and 1982-83 teams competed in the NCAA tournament.  Four of his teams competed in the NIT tournament (1979–80, 1980–81, 1983–84, 1984–85) with the 1983-84 team reaching the tournament's final four.  In addition to the 1983-84 team, his 1979-80 and 1984-85 teams reached the second round of the NIT. 

Paschal's overall coaching record at South Florida was 127-159 which included one conference tournament championship, two NCAA tournament appearances, and two NIT tournament appearances.  Bobby Paschal's ten years at South Florida saw the Bulls compete in three conferences.  As members of the Sun Belt Conference from the 1986-87 season to the 1990–91 season, the Bulls competed in the program's first NCAA tournament, the 1990 NCAA Men's Division I Basketball Tournament, after winning the Sun Belt Conference tournament championship.  The following year, South Florida's last season in the Sun Belt, the Bulls returned to post season play competing in the 1991 National Invitation Tournament.  The following year, as a new member of the Metro Conference, the Paschal coached Bulls received an at large bid to the 1992 NCAA Men's Division I Basketball Tournament.  At the end of the 1994-95 season, the Bulls's last season as a Metro Conference member, the Bobby Paschal coached team returned to the NIT advancing to the tournament's second round.  The next season saw a new conference as well as a new conference for the Bulls following the merger of the Metro Conference and the Great Midwest Conference.  That season also marked the final season for Bobby Paschal as a head coach.  He remained at the university an additional eight years.  In 2013, Bobby Paschal was named to the South Florida Bulls Hall of Fame.

References

1941 births
Living people
American men's basketball coaches
American men's basketball players
Basketball coaches from Alabama
Basketball players from Alabama
Chipola Indians men's basketball players
College men's basketball head coaches in the United States
Florida Southern Moccasins men's basketball coaches
High school basketball coaches in Alabama
High school basketball coaches in Florida
Louisiana Ragin' Cajuns men's basketball coaches
People from Enterprise, Alabama
South Florida Bulls men's basketball coaches
Stetson Hatters men's basketball players
West Alabama Tigers men's basketball coaches